Mati is a village in Sarojaninagar block of Lucknow district, Uttar Pradesh, India. As of 2011, its population was 5,833, in 1,071 households. A regular market is held here. It is the seat of a gram panchayat.

Land use 
The village lands cover an area of 1,172.3 hectares, of which 724.6 (61.8%) are farmland as of 2011. Of the total cultivated area, 80.4% was irrigated, all by well or tube well. Fallow lands covered an area of 72.9 hectares as of the same year, or 6.2% of the total land area. Lands under non-agricultural uses covered 295.4 hectares, or 25.2% of the total. Additionally, there was a forest cover of 75.1 hectares recorded in 2011, making up 6.4% of the total area.

References 

Villages in Lucknow district